Acanthophila silvania is a moth in the family Gelechiidae. It is only from the southern part of Primorsky Krai, Russia.

The wingspan is 11.5–12 mm. The forewings are dark grey with a light grey oblique line at three-fourths of the wing length and four blackish spots, found at the middle and end of the cell, at one-fourth and at the middle of the anal fold. There are also three spots at the middle of the wing. These are edged by light scales. The apex and termen are outlined by blackish scales at first, and by whitish scales further on. The hindwings are grey.

References

silvania
Moths described in 2003
Moths of Asia